969 Leocadia (prov. designation:  or ) is a very dark background asteroid from the inner regions of the asteroid belt, approximately  in diameter. It was discovered on 5 November 1921, by Russian astronomer Sergey Belyavsky at the Simeiz Observatory on the Crimean peninsula. The uncommon F-type asteroid (FX) has a rotation period of 6.9 hours and is likely regular in shape. Any reference of the asteroid's name to a person is unknown.

Orbit and classification 

Leocadia is a non-family asteroid of the main belt's background population when applying the hierarchical clustering method to its proper orbital elements. It orbits the Sun in the inner main-belt at a distance of 2.0–3.0 AU once every 3 years and 10 months (1,411 days; semi-major axis of 2.46 AU). Its orbit has an eccentricity of 0.21 and an inclination of 2° with respect to the ecliptic. The body's observation arc begins at Uccle Observatory in February 1933, more than a decade after its official discovery observation Simeiz Observatory on 5 November 1921.

Naming 

This minor planet is named after a Feminine Russian first name. Any reference of this name to a person or occurrence is unknown.

Unknown meaning 

Among the many thousands of named minor planets, Leocadia is one of 120 asteroids, for which no official naming citation has been published.

Physical characteristics 

In the Tholen classification (FXU:), Leocadia is an uncommon and dark F-type asteroid, somewhat similar to that of an X-type, though with an unusual (U) and noisy spectra.

Rotation period 

In December 2006, a rotational lightcurve of Leocadia was obtained from photometric observations by Italian amateur astronomers Roberto Crippa and Federico Manzini at the Sozzago Astronomical Station . Lightcurve analysis gave a rotation period of  hours with a brightness amplitude of  magnitude, which is indicative of a rather spherical, non-irregular shape.

Diameter and albedo 

The Collaborative Asteroid Lightcurve Link adopts the result from IRAS, that is, an albedo of 0.0435 and a diameter of 19.51 kilometers based on an absolute magnitude of 9.22.

An asteroid occultation on 19 August 2013, gave a best-fit ellipse dimension of 19.0 × 19.0 kilometers. These timed observations are taken when the asteroid passes in front of a distant star. However the measurements for Leocadia were of poor quality.

References

External links 
 Lightcurve Database Query (LCDB), at www.minorplanet.info
 Dictionary of Minor Planet Names, Google books
 Asteroids and comets rotation curves, CdR – Geneva Observatory, Raoul Behrend
 Discovery Circumstances: Numbered Minor Planets (1)-(5000) – Minor Planet Center
 
 

000969
Discoveries by Sergei Belyavsky
Named minor planets
000969
19211105